Calderini is an Italian surname. Notable people with the surname include:

Elio Calderini (born 1988), Italian footballer
Marco Calderini (1850–1944), Italian painter

See also
Calderoni

Italian-language surnames